Mohammad Ibrahim Baig (5 November 1925 – 7 July 2008), known by his pen name Khatir Ghaznavi; romanized: K̲h̲āt̤ir G̲h̲aznavī, was a Pakistani multilingual writer, poet, playwright, research scholar, and director of Pakistan Academy of Letters.
He wrote about forty-five to fifty books, including poems and children's books in Urdu, Hindko and Pashto languages throughout his life, though most of his literary work appears published in Urdu and Hindko.

He is sometimes referred to as researcher, linguist, columnist, educationist, and is also credited for conducting an extensive research on Hindko and Urdu literature. He is often recognized one of the prominent writers in Pashto literatures. The government of Pakistan later awarded him the Presidential Pride of Performance award in 1999 in recognition of his contribution to the country's literature.

Life and background
Ghaznavi was born as Mohammad Ibrahim Baig to an Afghan family in one of the ethnic groups of Afghanistan. His family originally belonged to central Afghanistan of Ghazni, and later migrated to Peshawar where he was raised. He had four daughters and three sons.

He did his primary schooling in Bannu and secondary education in Peshawar, and later attended the University of Peshawar in 1958 from where he did his master's degree in Urdu.  After completing his university education, he joined the same university and served as a lecture at Urdu faculty. He was then promoted to professor and later chairman. He did diploma in foreign languages such as Malay and later Chinese language which he obtained in 1965. He learnt local and foreign spoken languages, including Urdu, Pashto, Hindko, English, Persian, Chinese, Malay and Russian languages, which he used throughout his career, however he primarily used local ones while writing books. As an editor, he actively wrote columns while working at various magazines and newspapers, including national ones.

He served director of a research foundation Pakistan Academy of Letters (PAL) at Islamabad where he was involved in scholarly research with national academy. He was actively involved with literary organizations and tertiary institutions and served vice president of the Progressive Writers' Association for North-West Frontier Province (now Khyber Pakhtunkhwa) and chairperson of the University of Peshawar for Urdu department.

During his initial or later career, he worked as a photographer and had photographed a large number of historical photos of the Pakistan Movement, which were later published by a research institute of Peshawar Gandhara Hindko Board (GHB) in its daily Indo-Aryan linguistic cultural-based publication titled "Hindkowan"

Literary career
Ghaznavi started his career as a clerk at All India Radio, and was subsequently given Radio producer and then programme organizer designation during his seven years service. Between 1942 and 1962, he served as a producer at Radio Pakistan, including at its domestic service branches such as Peshawar and Rawalpindi. He also taught abroad and went to Malaysia, where he was assigned to write a "dictionary of common words" in specified languages such as Urdu and Malay. The dictionary, which is not-known was later published by the Government of Malaysia. He served head of the department (HOD) at the University of Malaya for Pakistan studies and Urdu department. He is also credited for introducing the Department of Chinese at the University of Peshawar.

He wrote his first novel at the time when he was studying in a school. He wrote about forty five books, including poetry. All of his poetic books published in Hindko language are collectively known as "Koonjan". He is also credited for translating Khushal Khattak's poetry into Urdu or Hindko. His poetry Khwab Dar Khwab is recognized one of the prominent books among his other writings. He wrote a book on Hindko that covers geography and its history. The book was later published by the National Language Promotion Department in 2003.

Urdu research 
Ghaznavi played a significant role in Urdu language development besides Pashto and Hindko. His contribution was recognized by the government on national level. However, his research into Urdu literature is sometimes considered "unorthodox". He wrote a book titled Urdu Zaban Ka Makhaz Hindko (Urdu language's source Hindko), which was later published in 2003 by the National Language Authority, claimed both Urdu and Hindi languages are etymologically associated with Hindko as their source or origin. His dialectical research was declined by its native speakers citing "Hindko language is a dialect of western Punjabi", making it geographically a distinct one.

Publications

Academic donation 
During his last days, he donated his all publications, including poetry, research and manuscripts, to the University of Peshawar where his books are preserved in a library.

Awards and honors
Pride of Performance Award by the President of Pakistan in 1999.

Death
Ghaznavi spent his last days in extreme difficult situation due to his aging, financial crisis, and eventually with deteriorated health. He was suffering from multiple ailments and was subsequently admitted to a hospital in Karachi for medical treatment and died there on 7 July 2008. He is buried in a cemetery in Peshawar.

Bibliography

References

Notes

1925 births
2008 deaths
Afghan emigrants to Pakistan
People from Peshawar
University of Peshawar alumni
Pakistani children's writers
Pashto-language poets
Urdu-language poets from Pakistan
Pakistani dramatists and playwrights
20th-century Pakistani writers
Recipients of the Pride of Performance